Duplass is a surname. Notable people with the surname include:

Jay Duplass (born 1973), American actor, director, screenwriter and producer
Mark Duplass (born 1976), American actor, director, screenwriter, producer and musician

See also
 Duplass Brothers Productions, their production company